Andries Pels (2 September 1655, in Amsterdam – 8 February 1731) was a rich Dutch banker and insurer from Amsterdam. He was the banker of France in the era of John Law.  He was nephew of his namesake, poet Andries Pels, and cousin to the colonial governor Paulus van der Veen. In 1742 his widow, Angenita Pels-Bouwens (1660–1749), was the richest woman in Amsterdam, living at the Golden Bend.

Pels formed the partnership Andries Pels & Soonen, dealing in luxury goods, insurance, and currency, in 1707 that lasted until 1774. Both his sons died in 1741. His daughter Johanna Sara Pels married Jan Bernd Bicker in 1720. Their sons Henric en Jan Bernd Bicker managed the bank from 1750. In 1767 Jan Bernd Bicker started to work as an apprentice; in 1771 he became a member of the board. In May 1773 the bank Pels & Zoonen went on for another year, but when Jan B. Bicker died in March 1774, the company came to an end.

References 

1655 births
1731 deaths
Dutch bankers
Businesspeople from Amsterdam